Karl Vilmundarson (6 December 1909 – 2 June 1983) was an Icelandic athlete. He competed in the men's decathlon at the 1936 Summer Olympics.

References

1909 births
1983 deaths
Athletes (track and field) at the 1936 Summer Olympics
Icelandic decathletes
Olympic athletes of Iceland
Place of birth missing